Pine Bluff commonly refers to:

 Pine Bluff, Arkansas, the county seat of Jefferson County

Pine Bluff may also refer to:

Places 
 Pine Bluff Arsenal, a military installation in Arkansas
 Pine Bluff, Arkansas, a city in Jefferson County, Arkansas
 Pine Bluff, West Virginia, an unincorporated community in Harrison County, West Virginia
 Pine Bluff, Wisconsin, an unincorporated community in Dane County, Wisconsin

Education 
 Pine Bluff High School, a comprehensive public high school in Pine Bluff, Arkansas

Events 
Battle of Pine Bluff, a battle of the American Civil War

Sports 
 Pine Bluff Judges, a minor league baseball team from Pine Bluff, Arkansas

Other uses
 Pine Bluff (horse), an American Thoroughbred racehorse

See also 
 
 
 Pinebluff, North Carolina, a town in Moore County
 Pine Bluffs, Wyoming, a town in Laramie County
 Pine Bluffs High School, a comprehensive public high school in Pine Bluffs, Wyoming